Benjamin Alexander Riley Jr. (July 17, 1933 – November 18, 2017) was an American jazz drummer known for his work with Thelonious Monk, as well as Alice Coltrane, Stan Getz, Eddie "Lockjaw" Davis, Ahmad Jamal, and as a member of the group Sphere. During the 1970s and 1980s he was a member of the New York Jazz Quartet.

Biography
Benjamin Alexander Riley Jr. was born in Savannah, Georgia, on July 17, 1933, and at the age of four moved with his family to New York City.

"Riley performed with Randy Weston, Sonny Stitt, Stan Getz, Junior Mance, Kenny Burrell, Eddie "Lockjaw" Davis–Johnny Griffin (1960–1962), Ahmad Jamal, Billy Taylor, and Ray Bryant." He then spent 1964 to 1967 in Thelonious Monk's quartet. After Monk, he played with Alice Coltrane (intermittently between 1968 and 1975), Ron Carter (1975–1977), Jim Hall (1981), and the bands the New York Jazz Quartet (1970s and 1980s) and Sphere. He also played frequently with pianist Abdullah Ibrahim.

Riley died of lung disease and complications of diabetes in West Islip, New York on November 18, 2017, aged 84

Discography

As leader 
 Weaver of Dreams (Joken, 1996) – recorded in 1993
 Memories of T (Concord, 2006)
 Grown Folks Music (Sunnyside, 2012)

As sideman 

With Noah Baerman
Patch Kit (CD Baby, 2006) with Ron Carter
With Chet Baker
As Time Goes By (Timeless, 1986)
Cool Cat (Timeless, 1986 [1989])
With Bill Barron
Variations in Blue (Muse, 1983)
Live at Cobi's 2 (SteepleChase, 1885 [2006])
The Next Plateau (Muse, 1987 [1989])
Live at Cobi's (SteepleChase, 1988-89 [2005])
With Kenny Barron
Innocence (Wolf, 1978)
Golden Lotus (Muse, 1980 [1982])
Imo Live (Whynot, 1982)
Green Chimneys (Criss Cross Jazz, 1983)
The Only One (Reservoir, 1990)
Lemuria-Seascape (Candid, 1991)
Live at Bradley's (EmArcy, 1996 [2001])
Live at Bradley's II (Sunnyside, 1996 [2002])
Minor Blues (Venus, 2009)
With Gary Bartz
Episode One: Children of Harlem (Challenge, 1994)
With Ted Brown
In Good Company (Criss Cross, 1985) with Jimmy Raney
With Ray Bryant
Live at Basin Street East (Sue, 1964)
Cold Turkey (Sue, 1964)
With Kenny Burrell
Listen to the Dawn (Muse, 1980 [1983])
Groovin' High (Muse, 1981 [1984])
With Ron Carter
 Yellow & Green (CTI, 1976)
 Piccolo (Milestone, 1977)
 Peg Leg (Milestone, 1978)
 Pick 'Em (Milestone, 1978 [1980])

With Alice Coltrane
 A Monastic Trio (1968)
 Ptah, the El Daoud (1970)
 World Galaxy (1972)
 Lord of Lords (1972)
 Live at the Berkeley Community Theater 1972 (BCT, 1972 [2019])

With Eddie "Lockjaw" Davis
 Afro-Jaws (Riverside, 1960)

With Ricky Ford
 Manhattan Blues (Candid, 1989)
 Ebony Rhapsody (Candid, 1990)
 American-African Blues (Candid, 1991)

With Red Garland
 Stepping Out (Galaxy, 1978)
 So Long Blues (Galaxy, 1979 [1981])
 Strike Up the Band (Galaxy, 1979 [1981])

With Benny Golson
 Time Speaks (Baystate, 1983) with Freddie Hubbard and Woody Shaw

With Bennie Green
 Glidin' Along (1961)

With Johnny Griffin
 Battle Stations (Prestige, 1960) – with Eddie "Lockjaw" Davis
 Johnny Griffin’s Studio Jazz Party (Riverside, 1960)
 Tough Tenors (Jazzland, 1960) – with Eddie "Lockjaw" Davis
 Griff & Lock (Jazzland, 1960) – with Eddie "Lockjaw" Davis
 The First Set (Prestige, 1961) – with Eddie "Lockjaw" Davis
 The Tenor Scene (Prestige, 1961) – with Eddie "Lockjaw" Davis
 The Late Show (Prestige, 1961) – with Eddie "Lockjaw" Davis
 The Midnight Show (Prestige, 1961) – with Eddie "Lockjaw" Davis
 Lookin' at Monk! (Jazzland, 1961) – with Eddie "Lockjaw" Davis
 Change of Pace (Riverside, 1961)
 Blues Up & Down (Jazzland, 1961) – with Eddie "Lockjaw" Davis
 White Gardenia (Riverside, 1961)
 The Kerry Dancers (Riverside, 1961–62)
 Tough Tenor Favorites (Jazzland, 1962) – with Eddie "Lockjaw" Davis

With Michael Franks
 Tiger in the Rain

With Andrew Hill
 Lift Every Voice (Blue Note, 1969)
 Shades (Soul Note, 1986)

With Hank Jones
 Bop Redux (Muse, 1977)
 The Great Jazz Trio, What's New (Baybridge, 1998)

With Sam Jones
 Down Home (Riverside, 1962)

With Junior Mance
 Junior Mance Trio at the Village Vanguard (Jazzland, 1961)
With Ken McIntyre
 Year of the Iron Sheep (United Artists, 1962)

With Jay McShann
Some Blues (Chiaroscuro, 1993)

With Thelonious Monk
 It's Monk's Time (1964)
 Monk (1964)
 Live at the It Club (1964)
 Straight, No Chaser (1967)
 Underground (1968)

With Freddie Redd
Lonely City (Uptown, 1985 [1989])

With Sonny Rollins
 The Bridge (RCA Victor, 1962)
 What's New? (RCA Victor, 1962)

With Charlie Rouse
 Moment's Notice (Storyville/Jazzcraft, 1978)

With Jack Sheldon
Playing for Change (Uptown, 1986 [1997])

With Sphere
Four in One (Elektra/Musician, 1982)
Flight Path (Elektra/Musician, 1983)
Sphere On Tour (Red, 1985)
Pumpkin's Delight (Red, 1986 [1993])
Four for All (Verve, 1987)
 Bird Songs (1988)
 Sphere (1998)

With Jeremy Steig
Flute Fever (Columbia, 1964)
With Horace Tapscott
 Dissent or Descent (Nimbus West, 1984 [1998])
With Roseanna Vitro
 Listen Here (Texas Rose, 1984)
With Larry Willis
A Tribute to Someone (AudioQuest, 1994)

References

External links

 Ben Riley interview at All About Jazz

1933 births
2017 deaths
20th-century African-American musicians
African-American jazz musicians
American jazz drummers
Hard bop drummers
Thelonious Monk
New York Jazz Quartet members
Musicians from New York (state)
Sphere (American band) members
Sunnyside Records artists